The Podhale-Magura Area (known in Polish as the Orava-Podhale Depression, Obniżenie Orawsko-Podhalańskie) — is a geomorfologic region of mountain ranges in northern Slovakia and southern Poland, belonging to the Outer Western Carpathians within the Carpathian Mountains system.

Subdivision
The Podhale-Magura Area consists of:

 Skorušina Mountains (SK: Skorušinské vrchy) + Spiš-Gubałówka Piedmont (PL: Pogórze Spisko-Gubałowskie)
 Sub-Tatra Furrow (SK: Podtatranská brázda, PL: Rów Podtatrzański)
 Spiš Magura (SK: Spišská Magura) + Spiš-Gubałówka Piedmont (PL: Pogórze Spisko-Gubałowskie)
 Levoča Mountains (SK: Levočské vrchy), with its highest point, Čierna hora (Black Mountain), 1,289 metres
 Bachureň (SK)
 Spiš-Šariš Intermontane (SK: Spišsko-šarišské medzihorie)
 Šariš Highlands (SK: Šarišská vrchovina)
 Orava Basin (SK: Oravská kotlina) + Orava-Nowy Targ Basin (PL: Kotlina Orawsko-Nowotarska)

The adjacent Pieniny range is sometimes considered part of the Podhale-Magura Area; otherwise considered as part of the Eastern section of the Western Beskids.

External links

Mountain ranges of Slovakia
Mountain ranges of the Western Carpathians
Geography of Prešov Region
Geography of Žilina Region
Landforms of Lesser Poland Voivodeship